Dwyer's snake (Suta dwyeri) also known commonly as the whip snake and the variable black-naped snake, is a species of venomous snake in the family Elapidae. The species is endemic to Australia, where it is found from New South Wales to South Queensland.  While closely related to Australian sea snakes, S. dwyeri is a terrestrial reptile.

Etymology
The specific name, dwyeri, is in honor of Australian herpetologist John Dwyer.

Taxonomy
There has been a great amount of instability of the nomenclature of many Australian snake taxa, particularly concerning the generic classification of the smaller Elapidae, some of which have been placed in several different genera in the span of just a few decades.

Accordingly, Dwyer's snake, which was originally named Denisonia dwyeri by Worrell in 1956, has been variously called Unechis dwyeri by Cogger in 1983, Suta dwyeri by Valentic in 1998, Suta spectabilis dwyeri by Cogger in 2000, and Parasuta dwyeri by Greer in 2006.

Description
Adult S. dwyeri  males average 31 cm (12 inches) in length from the tip of the snout to the uro-genital vent.  Females are slightly smaller at around 29 cm (11 inches) in snout-to-vent length (SVL). S. dwyeri has a cylindrical brown body with a slender to medium build.  The head is short and somewhat widened so as to be distinct from the neck.  The tail is short as well, and the dorsal scales are smooth. The eye is medium-sized, with a vertically elliptical pupil.

Reproduction
This species is viviparous rather than egg laying and successfully births about three offspring per brood.

Defense mechanisms
Like other snakes in the family Elapidae, S. dwyeri is venomous and has hollow fangs fixed at the front of the upper jaw.  These fangs are connected via ducts to venom glands near the eyes.  Like the majority of Australian elapids, Dwyer's snake is inoffensive and mostly harmless.  Herpetologists at the Queensland Museum describe Dwyer's snake as "weakly venomous", and do not include it among their list of eight snake species in the Brisbane area considered capable of inflicting potentially fatal bites.  A 25-year-old man in Western Sydney mildly describes a snakebite from this species by saying that he was:... bitten on the finger by a Suta dwyeri once. The bite did not hurt at all. But little did I know he had left his fang in my finger. A couple of days later it got a tiny bit infected and hurt for a couple of days ... nothing major though.
When threatened P. dwyeri prefers to coil into a tight ball as a defense mechanism for protection from larger predators.  This enables the snake to protect its head and more vulnerable areas of its body.

Behaviour and habitat
S. dwyeri is a secretive, nocturnal snake that seeks shelter under rocks, debris, and ground litter, and may make its home in burrows made and abandoned by other creatures.  Open woodland, grassland, and rocky areas are its preferred natural habitats.

Diet
S. dwyeri feeds mainly on small lizards such as geckos and skinks.

Images
Dwyer's snake
Dwyer's snake

References

Further reading
Cogger HG (2000). Reptiles and Amphibians of Australia, Sixth Edition. Sanibel Island, Florida: Ralph Curtis Publishing. 808 pp.
Cogger HG (2014). Reptiles and Amphibians of Australia, Seventh Edition. Clayton, Victoria, Australia: CSIRO Publishing. xxx + 1,033 pp. .
Coventry AJ (1971). "Identification of the Black-headed Snakes (Denisonia) within Victoria". Victorian Naturalist 88: 304–306. (Denisonia dwyeri, p. 305, Figure 1C).
Valentic R (1998). "A size record and further distributional data for Suta dwyeri (Elapidae) in the Sydney Basin". Herpetofauna (Sydney) 28 (1): 30–31.
Wilson S, Swan G (2013). A Complete Guide to Reptiles of Australia, Fourth Edition. Sydney: New Holland Publishers. 522 pp. .
Worrell E (1956). "A new snake from Queensland". Australian Zoologist 12: 202–205. (Denisonia dwyeri, new species).

Snakes of Australia
Suta
Taxa named by Eric Worrell
Reptiles described in 1956